The James M. Amoss Building (also known as the Knights of Pythias Building) is a historic commercial building located at 110 Wabash Street in Wabash, Wabash County, Indiana.

Description and history 
It was constructed in 1880, and is a two-story, three bay wide, Italianate-style brick building with a limestone foundation and quoins. It features a pressed metal dentil cornice and windows framed by limestone pilasters with simple Tuscan order capitals.

It was listed on the National Register of Historic Places on August 30, 1984. It is located in the Downtown Wabash Historic District.

References

Commercial buildings on the National Register of Historic Places in Indiana
Italianate architecture in Indiana
Commercial buildings completed in 1880
Buildings and structures in Wabash County, Indiana
Wabash, Indiana
National Register of Historic Places in Wabash County, Indiana
Historic district contributing properties in Indiana
1880 establishments in Indiana